The Blueberry River is a river in the Peace River Block of northeastern British Columbia, Canada.  It is a tributary of the Beatton River, which is a tributary of the Peace River.

This river should not be confused with the Blaeberry River near Golden, which is sometimes incorrectly known as the Blueberry River.

See also
List of rivers of British Columbia

References

Rivers of British Columbia
Peace River Country
Peace River Regional District